Karma Donnen Wangdi is a Bhutanese politician who has been Minister for Information and Communication since November 2018. He has been a member of the National Assembly of Bhutan, since October 2018. Previously he was the member of the National Council of Bhutan from 2008 to 2013.

Early life and education

He received a Bachelor of Arts degree in Economics from Sherubtse College, Bhutan. He completed his Postgraduate Diploma in IT from the MCMIS, the Netherlands.

Political career
Wangdi is a member of Druk Nyamrup Tshogpa (DNT).

He was elected to the National Council of Bhutan from Sarpang in the Bhutanese National Council election, 2008.

He was elected to the National Assembly of Bhutan in the 2018 elections for the Sarpang-Gelegphu constituency. He received 6,691 votes and defeated Pema Tashi, a candidate of DPT.

On 3 November, Lotay Tshering formally announced his cabinet structure and Wangdi was named as Minister for Information and Communication. On 7 November 2018, he was sworn in as Minister for Information and Communication in the cabinet of Prime Minister Lotay Tshering.

References 

Living people
Bhutanese politicians
1971 births
Bhutanese MNAs 2018–2023
Lotay Tshering ministry
Druk Nyamrup Tshogpa politicians
Sherubtse College alumni
Druk Nyamrup Tshogpa MNAs
Members of the National Council (Bhutan)